William Chatham  (July 1859–1941) was a Scottish-born engineer and government official of Hong Kong. He was the Director of Public Works from 1901 to 1921, as well as member of the Executive and Legislative Councils and Vice-President of the Sanitary Board.

Biography
He was born in July 1859 and was educated at the Royal High School, Edinburgh and at Edinburgh University. He was trained to be an engineer and joined the Thos. Meik & Sons, the then well-known civil engineering firm, as an assistant and then the engineer of the Bristol Docks. He arrived in Hong kong in 1890 as an Executive Engineer with the Public Works Department and became the Director of Public Works in 1901 as well as a member of the Executive and Legislative Councils and Vice-President of the Sanitary Board. He was a member of the Queen's Jubilee Committee, acting as honorary secretary for some years and took part in the £20,000 construction of the Jubilee Road (today's Victoria Road) and the Hospital for Women and Children (later known as Victoria Hospital). He resided at the Peak and was member of the Hong Kong Club.

When Chatham retired in 1921, a valediction published in the Hong Kong Government Administration Report of 1921 stated that "The majority of the Public Works of the Colony as they exist today are standing monument to his energy and foresight."

Chatham Road North, Chatham Road South and Chatham Court in Tsim Sha Tsui, Kowloon and Chatham Path on the Hong Kong Island are all named after him.

He had a daughter named Agnes Catherine and five sons.  Agnes married Edward Dudley Corscaden Wolfe, who was an Assistant Registrar-General and Police Magistrate in Hong Kong.

After his retirement in 1921 he and his wife returned to the UK and lived in London. He died in 1941 aged 81.

References

1859 births
1941 deaths
People educated at the Royal High School, Edinburgh
Alumni of the University of Edinburgh
Members of the Executive Council of Hong Kong
Members of the Legislative Council of Hong Kong
Members of the Urban Council of Hong Kong
Hong Kong civil servants
Hong Kong civil engineers
Scottish civil engineers
Government officials of Hong Kong
Companions of the Order of St Michael and St George